The Standards Council of Canada (SCC) / Conseil Canadien des Normes (CCN) is a Canadian organization with the mandate to promote voluntary standardization in Canada. The SCC is responsible for:

 accreditation of standards development and conformity assessment organizations; 
 approval of standards submitted as National Standards of Canada (NSCs); 
 adoption of relevant policies to support SCC programs and services; and 
 approval of budgets and audited financial statements.

SCC has a governing council that oversees the organization, and an executive staff that is responsible for the operation of the organization. The organization reports to Parliament through the Minister of Innovation, Science and Economic Development, receiving some funding from the federal government, as well as revenue from accreditation services and donations from individuals and organizations in support of international standardization work.

SCC represents Canada in ISO and IEC.

Oversight 

SCC coordinates the Canadian national standardization network, which includes organizations and individuals involved in voluntary standards development, promotion, and implementation.

Standards development
SCC develops and implements the National Standards Strategy, a national plan for the development of voluntary technical standards in support of national social and business goals.

More than 12,500 Canadian volunteer members contribute to committees that develop international standards. Many of these volunteers also serve in national standards development activities through SDOs accredited by SCC.

Accreditation
SCC has accredited more than 400 organizations, overseeing the accreditation of SDOs and global certification bodies. These activities have increased competition in the certification market, and have contributed to reducing the time-to-market for businesses whose products require certification.

Governance 

The SCC's governing Council, appointed by the federal government, is responsible for overseeing the organization's strategic direction, ensuring the fulfillment of its mandate, and providing guidance on governance matters. The council also works closely with SCC management in developing policy items and providing advice on the organization's strategic direction.

History 

In 1964, the federal government conducted a comprehensive review of standards activity in Canada. The study identified a number of deficiencies in the country's approach to standardization, including coordination and long-term planning, support from industry and government, and Canadian involvement in international standardization.

In 1970, the government responded by establishing the Standards Council of Canada through the Standards Council of Canada Act, which received Royal Assent in the same year. Two years later, the SCC held a seat on the International Organization for Standardization’s governing Council.

Accreditation Services Branch 

SCC's Accreditation Services branch accredits conformity assessment bodies, such as testing laboratories and product certification bodies, to internationally recognized standards. Conformity assessment is the practice of determining whether a product, service or system meets the requirements of a particular standard.

The organization operates accreditation and recognition programs for the following: 
 Calibration and testing laboratories
 Good laboratory practice
 Greenhouse gas validators and verifiers
 Inspection bodies
 Management systems certification bodies
 Medical laboratories
 Personnel certification bodies
 Product and service certification bodies
 Proficiency testing providers
 Standards developing organizations (SDOs)

SCC is also a member of a number of organizations that have mutual recognition agreements in place to assist with international acceptance of conformity assessment results. These agreements are part of greater efforts to form a global accreditation system.

Strategy and Stakeholder Engagements Branch (SSEB) 

The SSEB Branch conducts outreach and engagement of stakeholders with the greatest potential influence and impact on standardization in Canada. Through its analysis of trends and conditions of significance to standardization-related work, the SSEB branch is able to identify and define the necessary conditions for Canada to optimize its use of standardization; facilitate the development of roadmaps in support of targeted economic areas; and make recommendations that influence standards and conformity assessment related aspects of trade and regulatory policy.

Standards and International Relations Branch (SIRB) 

Standards play an important role in ensuring better, safer and more efficient methods and products, and are essential for technology, innovation and trade. Standards are developed through consensus by committees of affected stakeholders that may include representatives from industry, government, academia and the public interest. These committees are established and managed by an organization that specializes in the development of standards. Most standards are voluntary—there are no laws requiring their application.

However, an increasingly competitive marketplace for goods and services means that more and more customers are demanding adherence to specific standards. Governments also make some standards mandatory by referencing them in legislation or regulations. SCC accredits organizations that develop standards in Canada. Accreditation is the verification that an organization has the competence necessary to carry out a specific function.

SCC's accreditation programs are based on internationally recognized guidelines and standards. SCC accredits Canadian standards development organizations and also approves Canadian standards as National Standards of Canada, based on a specific set of requirements.

The Role of SIRB

SCC does not develop standards itself. It plays the role of coordinating standards work in Canada and ensuring Canada's input on standards issues within international standards organizations.

SCC's Standards branch is organized into three sections: Canadian Standards Development, International Standards Development and Global Standards Governance. The branch carries out a variety of functions intended to ensure the effective and coordinated operation of standardization in Canada.

The branch also represents Canada's interests in standards-related matters in foreign and international forums. SIRB also manages Canadian participation in the standards development initiatives of the International Organization for Standardization (ISO) and the International Electrotechnical Commission (IEC) — two of the world's largest voluntary standardization bodies — as well as participation in regional standards organizations.

Publications 

A catalogue of all Standards Council of Canada (SCC) publications can be found on its corporate website, including various brochures, fact sheets, studies and reports on standardization-related topics.

See also 
 World Standards Day

References

External links 
 Standards Council of Canada (SCC)
 International Organization for Standardization (ISO)
 International Electrotechnical Commission (IEC)

1970 establishments in Ontario
Canadian federal Crown corporations
Innovation, Science and Economic Development Canada
Canada